Maureen Kennedy Salaman (April 4, 1936 – August 17, 2006) was an American author, proponent of alternative medicine, and candidate of the American Independent Party for Vice President of the United States in the 1984 election.

Biography
Salaman was born in 1936 in Glendale, California. Her father, Ted Kennedy, served in the United States Navy and was killed in World War II when Maureen was a child. The family then relocated to San Mateo County, California.

Salaman claimed to be a nutritionist with a Master of Science degree from Donsbach University, an unaccredited entity, and was prominently involved in alternative medicine. She was elected president of the National Health Federation, an alternative medicine lobbying group, in 1982. She held that position, with two interruptions, until her death. Critics noted that she had been "very active in promoting questionable cancer remedies". Psychiatrist Stephen Barrett of Quackwatch wrote that her books "contain hundreds of unsubstantiated suggestions for using foods, dietary supplements, and herbs for a wide range of diseases and conditions."

Salaman was nominated on the right-wing American Independent Party's ticket in 1984 along with Bob Richards, a former Olympic pole vaulter. They received 66,324 votes (0.07%).

Personal life
Salaman married Gerard Morton in 1957, and that marriage produced two children, Sean and Colleen. The couple divorced, and after several years she married Frank Salaman. In 1976, Frank Salaman was charged with conspiracy to smuggle laetrile into the United States. He was found guilty by a jury in 1977, fined $10,000, and placed on probation for three years.Maureen Salaman was an outspoken advocate of laetrile usage as a cancer preventive and treatment. In 1999, she married a third time, to Ross Burdette Gordon.

Salaman died at her home in Atherton, California in 2006 from pancreatic cancer.

Selected publications

Nutrition: The Cancer Answer (1984)
The Diet Bible: The Bible for Dieters (1994)
Nutrition: The Cancer Answer II (1995)
How to Renew You: The Complete Primer on Age Reversal (2003)

References

1936 births
2006 deaths
20th-century far-right politicians in the United States
Alternative cancer treatment advocates
Alternative medicine activists
1984 United States vice-presidential candidates
People from Glendale, California
People from Atherton, California
Pseudoscientific diet advocates
20th-century American women writers
Populist Party (United States, 1984) politicians
Christian fundamentalists
Female candidates for Vice President of the United States
Women in California politics
Activists from California
21st-century American women
Writers from California